The 1992 Copa CONMEBOL Finals were the final two-legged series that decided the winner of 1992 Copa CONMEBOL, the first edition of this international competition. The finals were contested by Clube Atlético Mineiro of Brazil and Club Olimpia of Paraguay. 

The matches were held at the Mineirão, in Belo Horizonte, and at Estadio Manuel Ferreira, in Asunción. Atlético Mineiro won the tie 2–1 to claim its first title in the competition, and qualified for the 1993 Copa de Oro and the 1993 Copa CONMEBOL through its victory.

Qualified teams

Venues

Route to the final

Note: In all results below, the score of the finalist is given first (H: home; A: away).

Match details

First leg

Second leg

See also
1992 Copa CONMEBOL

References 

General
 
 
 

1992 in South American football
Copa CONMEBOL Finals
Conmebol Final 1992
Conmebol Final 1992